Joseph William Battisto was a Democratic member of the Pennsylvania House of Representatives.

He graduated from Stroudsburg High School in 1949. He earned a degree from East Stroudsburg State College in 1956 and an M.S. degree from the University of Scranton in 1966.

He was sworn in to represent the 189th legislative district in 1983, a position he held until his defeat by Republican Kelly Lewis in the 2000 general election. In an April 2002 special election, he ran against Mario Scavello for the newly reconfigured 176th legislative district.

In 2013, the Marshalls Creek bypass was named for the former legislator, who along with former Smithfield Township Supervisor Al Wilson, came up with the idea to create it.

Personal life 
Joseph was born on June 27, 1931 in Mount Pocono, Pennsylvania to Jennie (née Santasiero) and Angelo Battisto. He was the eldest of four children, and grew up with his sisters Mary Battisto Gunn and Genevieve Battisto, and brother Thomas Battisto.

In 1961, he married Virginia Marie Mayer. They had four children:
Joseph William Battisto, Jr.,
James William Battisto,
Pamela Battisto Watkins, and
Jessica Battisto Dieffenbacher.

Joseph was a grandfather of eight:
Rachel Watkins,
Allison Watkins,
Evan Battisto,
Joseph Battisto III,
Victoria Watkins,
Brielle Battisto,
Blake Battisto, and
Sage Battisto.

References

External links
 official PA House profile (archived)

2014 deaths
1931 births
Democratic Party members of the Pennsylvania House of Representatives
People from Monroe County, Pennsylvania
University of Scranton alumni